Africepermenia is a monotypic genus of moths in the family Epermeniidae. Its sole species, Africepermenia tanzanica, was described by Reinhard Gaedike in 2004. It is found in Kenya and Tanzania.

References

Moths described in 2004
Epermeniidae
Monotypic moth genera
Moths of Africa